Acromyrmex echinatior is a species of New World ants of the subfamily Myrmicinae of the genus Acromyrmex.  It is found in the wild naturally from Mexico to Panama.

In Costa Rica this species prefers open dry habitats such as urban areas around San Jose and seasonally dry habitats of Guanacaste Province. There is evidence to suggest that this species nests may occasionally be arboreal.

Queens multiply mate, and colonies are facultatively polygynous.  Nonreproductive workers of the colony 'police', that is, selectively destroy worker-laid eggs, but do not attack reproductive workers. Relatedness incentives are the most likely ultimate cause of the evolutionary maintenance of worker–egg policing in A. echinatior.

See also
List of leafcutter ants

References

Acromyrmex
Insects described in 1899
Hymenoptera of North America